Steel Frontier is a 1995 post-apocalyptic science fiction Western film directed by Jacobsen Hart and Paul G. Volk and starring Joe Lara, Bo Svenson, Stacie Foster, Brion James, Kane Hodder, James C. Victor, Billy L. Sullivan, Robert O'Reilly, Brian Huckeba, and Adolfo Quinones.

Plot
In 2019, a gang of bandits called the United Regime Deathriders invade the town of New Hope. They are led by General Julius 'J.W.' Quantrill (Brion James), a descendant of Confederate cavalry officer William Quantrill. A mysterious motorcycle riding gunslinger named Johnny Yuma (Joe Lara) arrives in town and joins the gang, but actually plays the thugs against each other, causing the drunken riders to shoot each other. The next morning Sarah and her son kills two other gangmembers, but the Deathriders believes Yuma is responsible. Yuma challenges his accusers to a duel and shoots all six before their guns even clear their holsters. He is chased by the rest of the gang to the tire refinery, but kills them all, including Julius Quantrill Jr. The son of General Julius 'J.W.' Quantrill.

Leaving one lone survivor, Colonel Roy Ackett (Bo Svenson) to escape so he can warn Quantrill. Most of the townsfolk flee but Sarah and a handful of people stay to help Yuma. Quantrill descends on the town with his entire army, only to find the road blocked by coffins filled with the bodies of his son and Deathriders. Enraged, he shoots Ackett with a shotgun and yells in fury "Leave noun alive". Quantrill's Deathriders enter the town, only to find it empty. The buildings, rigged with explosives, are detonated and most of Quantrill's army is destroyed. The remaining thugs converge on the town center and are attacked by armed townsfolk. Quantrill spots Yuma in a tower and sends his men after him. When they enter the tower Yuma abseils down and detonates a bomb hidden inside.

Meanwhile, Sarah's son hides in an armored school bus which is later taken by Quantrill and chased by Yuma and Sarah. Aftet a chase, in which Yuma boards the bus and fights Quantrill, it crashes, and is then split apart by the truck Sara is driving. Yuma and Quantrill are thrown onto the road, where they lie, injured, both within reach of their guns. Yuma fires first and kills Quantrill.

Yuma loads Quantrill's corpse onto his bike and reveals he was a bounty hunter targeting Quantrill. He rides away to seek out more lawless tyrants and bandits to help rebuild the world.

Cast
 Joe Lara as Johnny Yuma
 Brion James as General Julius "J.W." Quantrell
 Bo Svenson as Colonel Roy Ackett
 Stacie Foster as Sarah
 Kane Hodder as Kinton
 James C. Victor as Julius Quantrell Jr.
 Billy L. Sullivan as Lake
 Brian Huckeba as "Chickenboy"
 Jim Cody Williams as Charlie Bacchas
 Robert O'Reilly as Evermore
 Joe Hart as Greenstreet
 Adolfo Quinones as Deacon
 Bruce Ed Morrow as Precher
 Sandra Ellis Lafferty as Ada
 Paul G. Volk as Lee
 Scott McAboy as Nedleton
 Ernie Lee Banks as Wellman
 Quinn Morrison as Mayor Kissmich
 Afifi Alaouie as Shay
 Gordon Benson as Grandpa Lem
 Michael Ross Clements as Knog, Space Droid

Reception
One reviewer said of the film, "Skip this movie and work on your end of the world go-bag instead."

References

External links
 

1995 films
1995 independent films
1990s Western (genre) science fiction films
1990s science fiction action films
American post-apocalyptic films
American Western (genre) science fiction films
American science fiction action films
1990s English-language films
Films set in 2019
Films set in the future
1990s American films